Anaesthetis is a genus of longhorn beetles belonging to the subfamily Lamiinae.

It is common in Europe and includes the following species:
 Anaesthetis anatolica Holzschuh, 1969
 Anaesthetis confossicollis  Baeckmann, 1903
 Anaesthetis flavipilis Baeckmann, 1903
 Anaesthetis lanuginosa Baeckmann, 1903
 Anaesthetis lepida Germar, 1848
 Anaesthetis testacea (Fabricius, 1781)

References

 Holzschuh, C., 1969: Zwei neue Bockkäferarten aus der Türkei. Zeitschr. der Arbeitsgemeinschaft österr. Entomologen 21 (3): 77–79. Full article: .

External links

Desmiphorini
Beetles of Europe